The Cupid Club (French: Bal Cupidon) is a 1949 comedy crime film directed by Marc-Gilbert Sauvajon and starring Pierre Blanchar, Simone Renant and Yves Vincent. It was shot during 1948, but released the following year. It was made at the Photosonor Studios in Paris, with sets designed by the art director Eugène Delfau.

Synopsis
Flip, an amateur detective is arrested for speeding and is prosecuted by the lawyer Isabelle and convicted. When shortly afterwards a man is murdered the two join forces to investigate. Much of the mystery surrounds a nightclub Bal Cupidon whose owner was having an affair with the dead man's wife.

Cast
 Pierre Blanchar as Flip
 Simone Renant as 	Isabelle
 Yves Vincent as Morezzi
 Marcelle Praince as 	Mme Chanut
 Suzanne Dantès as 	Mme Delacroix
 Henri Crémieux as 	Cresat
 Maria Mauban as 	Anne-Marie
 René Blancard as Turnier
 André Bervil as 	Tonio
 Marion Tourès as 	Christine
 Germaine Michel as 	Clémence
 François Joux as 	Gratien
 Pierre Juvenet as 	Le président Chanut
 Albert Michel as 	Le gardien
 Janine Miller as L'annonceuse
 Yvonne Ménard as 	La danseuse
 Odette Barencey as 	La cuisinière
 Henry Murray as 	Le commissaire
 André Wasley as 	Victor
 Christiane Delacroix as La bonne
 Henri Niel as 	Le directeur de la prison
 Christian Duvaleix as 	Le photographe
 Julien Maffre as 	Un monsieur

References

Bibliography 
 Rège, Philippe. Encyclopedia of French Film Directors, Volume 1. Scarecrow Press, 2009.

External links 
 

1949 films
1949 comedy films
French comedy films
1940s French-language films
Films directed by Marc-Gilbert Sauvajon
1940s French films